Joseph Binette (May 1, 1861 – January 19, 1950) was an Ontario farmer, businessman and political figure. He represented Prescott in the House of Commons of Canada as a Liberal member from 1922 to 1925.

He was born in St. Eugene, Canada West in 1861, the son of Joseph Binette and Flavie Bissonnette. He married Palmyre Lavigne in 1887. He operated a farm and was a hay and grain dealer at Sainte-Anne-de-Prescott. Binette served on the township council for four years and was reeve for East Hawkesbury Township for 15 years. He was elected as a Progressive in 1921 but joined the Liberal caucus in the House of Commons in 1922.

He died in Sainte-Anne-de-Prescott at the age of 88.

References 
 Histoire des Comtes Unis de Prescott et de Russell, L. Brault (1963) 

1861 births
1950 deaths
Progressive Party of Canada MPs
Liberal Party of Canada MPs
Members of the House of Commons of Canada from Ontario
Franco-Ontarian people